Silwal is a Nepalese surname belonging to the Khas people of both the Bahun and Chhetri caste.

Notable people with the surname Silwal include:
Bhola Silwal, (born 1987) is a Nepali professional footballer
Bhupendra Silwal, Nepalese long-distance runner
Mahima Silwal, Nepalese actress
Nawaraj Silwal, Nepalese Politician, former DIG of Nepal Police
Yadav Kant Silwal, Nepalese diplomat and former Foreign Secretary

References

Ethnic groups in Nepal
Nepali-language surnames
Khas surnames
Kshatriya communities
Brahmin communities